Aillevillers-et-Lyaumont is a commune in the Haute-Saône department in the region of Bourgogne-Franche-Comté in eastern France.

The village is included in the land area awarded AOC status in May 2010 in respect of Fougerolles Kirsch, a cherry-based liquor produced nearby.

During the nineteenth century a number of commercial distilleries producing Kirsch were operating at Aillevillers-et-Lyaumont itself, but their number had diminished by the start of the twentieth century and the last survivor closed down in 1976.

Population

See also
Communes of the Haute-Saône department

References

Communes of Haute-Saône
Haute-Saône communes articles needing translation from French Wikipedia